The 2019–20 Azerbaijan Premier League was the 28th season of the Azerbaijan Premier League with Qarabağ being the defending champions. The season began on 16 August 2019, before being prematurely ended on 19 June 2020.

Season events
On 13 March 2020, the Azerbaijan Premier League was postponed due to the COVID-19 pandemic.

On 19 June 2020, the AFFA announced that the Azerbaijan Premier League was officially ended without the resumption of the remains matches due to the escalating situation of the COVID-19 pandemic in Azerbaijan. As a result Qarabağ were crowned champions for the seventh season in a row, whilst also qualifying for the 2020–21 UEFA Champions League, with Neftçi, Keşla and Sumgayit qualifying for the 2020–21 UEFA Europa League.

Teams

Stadia and locations
Note: Table lists in alphabetical order.

Stadiums

Personnel and kits

Note: Flags indicate national team as has been defined under FIFA eligibility rules. Players may hold more than one non-FIFA nationality.

Foreign players
A team could use only six foreign players on the field in each game.

In bold: Players that capped for their national team.

Managerial changes

League table

Results
Clubs will play each other four times for a total of 28 matches each.

Matches 1–14

Matches 15–28

Season statistics

Top scorers

Top assists

Clean sheets

Scoring
 First goal of the season: Ismayil Ibrahimli for Qarabağ against Keşla on 16 August 2019.

See also
 Azerbaijan Premier League
 Azerbaijan First Division

References

External links
UEFA

2019–20 in European association football leagues
2019–20
1
Azerbaijan